An open-access network (OAN) refers to a horizontally layered network architecture in telecommunications, and the business model that separates the physical access to the network from the delivery of services. In an OAN, the owner or manager of the network does not supply services for the network; these services must be supplied by separate retail service providers. There are two different open-access network models: the two- and three-layer models.

"Open Access" refers to a specialised and focused business model, in which a network infrastructure provider limits its activities to a fixed set of value layers in order to avoid conflicts of interest. The network infrastructure provider creates an open market and a platform for internet service providers (ISPs) to add value. The Open Access provider remains neutral and independent and offers standard and transparent pricing to ISPs on its network. It never competes with the ISPs.

History
In the 20th century, analog telephone and cable television networks were designed around the limitations of the prevailing technology. The copper-wired twisted pair telephone networks were not able to carry television programming, and copper-wired coaxial cable television networks were not able to carry voice telephony. Towards the end of the twentieth century, with the rise of packet switching—as used on the Internet—and IP-based and wireless technologies, it became possible to design, build, and operate a single high performance network capable of delivering hundreds of services from multiple, competing providers.

Two models
An OAN uses a different business model than traditional telecommunications networks. Regardless of whether the two- or three-layer model is used, an open-access network fundamentally means that there is an "organisational separation" of each of the layers. In other words, the network owner/operator cannot also be a retailer on that network.

Two-layer model
In the two-layer OAN model, there is a network owner and operator, and multiple retail service providers that deliver services over the network.

Three-layer model
In the three-layer OAN model the physical layer—the fiber or wireless infrastructure—is owned by one company, the operations and maintenance of the network and the provision of services is run by a second company, and the retail service providers provide the third layer.

Applications
The OAN concept is appropriate for both fiber and WiFi access networks, especially where exclusivity cannot be allowed. The shared maintenance costs make it appropriate for rural areas, where traditional Internet service providers (ISP) may be reluctant to provide a service. Open access networks are also viewed as a feasible way of deploying next-generation broadband networks in low population density areas where service providers cannot obtain a sufficient return on investment to cover the high costs associated with trenching, right-of-way encroachment permits, and the requisite network infrastructure.

In contrast to traditional municipal networks where the municipality owns the network and there is only one service provider, the open access model allows multiple service providers to compete over the same network at wholesale prices. This allows service providers to make money in the short-term, and the municipality or cooperative to recoup its costs over the long-term. The build-out and infrastructure is typically financed through low-cost bonds.

Open access networks have proven successful in parts of the United States initially as "middle mile" networks and more recently as "last mile" networks, Europe, and Asia. However, "last mile" OANs in the United States have begun to attract more interest as rural and suburban communities seek to catalyze economic development. One of the best known and most mature OANs is in Västerås, Sweden, a city of about 40,000 homes. The Västerås OAN has dozens of providers, and more than a hundred services available to users. During the past years a large number of OANs have spread all over Sweden, especially in smaller municipalities (see e.g. Säffle and Hudiksvall). In the US, open access networks like municipality owned The Wired Road in Virginia have been able to attract both local and regional service providers quickly. This has resulted in the cost of Internet access and telephone service for business users in The Wired Road service area to decline by fifty to seventy percent due to the increased competition between providers. This OAN provides open access transport to any service provider that meets minimum technical and financial qualifications, including allowing existing providers to supply enhanced services, however, it does sell services itself and therefore does not compete with private sector providers.

New Zealand, Australia and Singapore also have open-access networks based on fiber to the home. In new Zealand Crown Fibre Holdings has been established to manage the Government's $1.5 billion investment in Ultra-Fast Broadband infrastructure. The Government's objective is to accelerate the roll-out of Ultra-Fast Broadband to 75 percent of New Zealanders over ten years. In Australia, the leading open-access provider currently is Opticomm, who have been delivering services to over sixty communities since the mid-2000s. Australia also has the recently formed government owned corporation NBN Co, who are creating the National Broadband Network to provide open-access fiber to the node at one gigabit per second for more than ninety-three percent of homes and businesses in the country, and fixed wireless and satellite technologies with a minimum speed of twelve megabits per second to the remainder of the population.

See also
Access network
Municipal broadband
Rural Internet
Local-loop unbundling

References 

 M. Forzati, C. P. Larsen, C. Mattsson, Open access networks, the Swedish experience (invited), proceedings of the International Conference on Transparent Optical Networks (ICTON) 2010, Munich, Germany, paper We.A4.5.
 Andrew Cohill, Ph.D., Broadband for America: The Third Way
 Roberto Battiti, Renato Lo Cigno, Fredrik Orava, Bjorn Pehrson, Global growth of open access networks: from warchalking and connection sharing to sustainable business, Proceedings of the 1st ACM international workshop on Wireless mobile applications and services on WLAN hotspots, September 19-19, 2003, San Diego, CA, USA

External links 
NDIX – Dutch/German non-profit fiber OAN
Irish OAN
Guifi.net, Catalonia (Spain) OAN-related network
Northwest OAN
StockholmOpen.net
International Network of E-Communities

Network architecture